Licques is a commune in the Pas-de-Calais department in the Hauts-de-France region of France.

Geography
A farming village located 24 km south of Calais in the valley of the Hem, at the junction of the D191 and D215 roads. It is a large producer of turkeys and other fowl.

Population

Places of interest
 The eighteenth-century château de Cahen.
 The ruins of the château of Courtebourne.
 Vestiges of the 11th century Premonstrate abbey, nowadays the parish church.

Turkey festival

Licques holds an annual turkey festival, which features a parade of local notables in traditional robes and costumes herding turkeys through the town center, led by the Noble Dames and Knights of the Brotherhood of the Turkey. In the past, a local liqueur was served heated from a communal cauldron set up in the town square, but this has been replaced in recent years by turkey soup.

Cultural events are staged throughout the day, and a large farmer's market is set up, selling turkeys and other local produce.

See also
Communes of the Pas-de-Calais department

References

Communes of Pas-de-Calais